Clinton Township, Ohio, may refer to:

Clinton Township, Franklin County, Ohio
Clinton Township, Fulton County, Ohio
Clinton Township, Knox County, Ohio
Clinton Township, Seneca County, Ohio
Clinton Township, Shelby County, Ohio
Clinton Township, Vinton County, Ohio
Clinton Township, Wayne County, Ohio

Ohio township disambiguation pages